The East Shelbyville Historic District is a historic district on the east side of Shelbyville, Tennessee. It includes roughly ten square blocks, mostly residential. It is bordered by the N. Brittian, Louisville, and Nashville railroad tracks and Lane, Evans, Sandusky and Madison Streets. It was listed on the National Register of Historic Places in April 1990.

References

Shelbyville, Tennessee
National Register of Historic Places listings in Bedford County, Tennessee
Historic districts on the National Register of Historic Places in Tennessee
National Register of Historic Places in Bedford County, Tennessee